Mickey Bey Jr. (born June 27, 1983) is an American professional boxer and former IBF lightweight champion.

Professional career

Bey vs. Rodriguez 
On February 2, 2013, Bey defeated Robert Rodríguez by third-round knockout, but tested positive for testosterone in the post-fight drug test. He was fined $1,000 and suspended for three months.

Bey vs. Vazquez 
On September 13, 2014, Bey defeated Miguel Vázquez by twelfth-round split decision to win the IBF lightweight title, his first world title. This bout was on the card of Floyd Mayweather vs. Marcos Maidana II.

Vacating the IBF lightweight title 
Bey was scheduled to face Denis Shafikov as his first defence, on April 30, as an ESPN2 main event in Las Vegas. Moretti and Leonard Ellerbe of Mayweather Promotions were even able to make a deal for the bout despite the poor relationship between the companies. However, Bey ultimately turned down a purse of about $200,000, and the bout was cancelled on short notice. The bout was then put up for a purse bid, and Top Rank, the only bidder, won the promotional rights with an offer of $78,000.

Although Bey signed a contract to go to Macau, China, to make a mandatory defence of his lightweight world title against Shafikov on July 18, he has again backed out of the fight and the vacated the title on July 3, 2015, having failed to defend the title once. Whilst he did ultimately vacate the title the IBF were on the verge of stripping him for failing to meet his contractual obligation to face his mandatory challenger.

Bey vs. Barthelemy 
Bey fought Rances Barthelemy on 3 June 2016, for the IBF lightweight championship of the world. Barthelemy won by split decision. The scorecards were announced as 117-110, 110-117, 116-111 in favor of Barthelemy.

Bey vs. Kambosos Jnr 
George Kambosos Jnr fought Bey on 14 December 2019 at Madison Square Garden in New York. Kambosos Jnr won by split decision in their 10 round contest. The scorecards were announced as 94-95, 97-92, 96-93 in favor of Kambosos Jnr.

Professional boxing record

See also
List of lightweight boxing champions

References

External links

Mickey Bey - Profile, News Archive & Current Rankings at Box.Live

1983 births
Living people
Boxers from Cleveland
American male boxers
African-American boxers
Lightweight boxers
World lightweight boxing champions
International Boxing Federation champions
National Golden Gloves champions
Doping cases in boxing
21st-century African-American sportspeople
20th-century African-American people